Canetti Peak is a 400 m peak in the Friesland Ridge, Tangra Mountains, eastern Livingston Island in the South Shetland Islands, Antarctica.  The peak has precipitous and ice-free western slopes and overlooks Zagore Beach and False Bay to the west and north, and Charity Glacier to the south.  The peak was named after Elias Canetti (1905–1994), a Bulgarian-born Nobel laureate in literature.

Location

The peak was mapped by Bulgaria in 2005 and 2009.

Maps
 L.L. Ivanov et al. Antarctica: Livingston Island and Greenwich Island, South Shetland Islands. Scale 1:100000 topographic map. Sofia: Antarctic Place-names Commission of Bulgaria, 2005.
 L.L. Ivanov. Antarctica: Livingston Island and Greenwich, Robert, Snow and Smith Islands. Scale 1:120000 topographic map.  Troyan: Manfred Wörner Foundation, 2009.

References
 Canetti Peak. SCAR Composite Gazetteer of Antarctica
 Bulgarian Antarctic Gazetteer. Antarctic Place-names Commission. (details in Bulgarian, basic data in English)

External links
 Canetti Peak. Adjusted Copernix satellite image

Tangra Mountains